Belmont Plantation is an Antebellum plantation in Wayside, Washington County, Mississippi.

History
The mansion was built in 1857 by W.W. Worthington. It was visited by Union forces in 1863, in the midst of the American Civil War of 1861–1865.

It was turned into the Belmont Hunting Lodge by Mississippi Governor Dennis Murphree in 1946.

It is a wedding & event space, luxury hunting lodge, and bed & breakfast.

Heritage significance
It has been listed on the National Register of Historic Places since April 11, 1972.

References

External links

Houses on the National Register of Historic Places in Mississippi
Houses in Washington County, Mississippi
Plantation houses in Mississippi
Plantations in Mississippi
National Register of Historic Places in Washington County, Mississippi
1857 establishments in Mississippi